Dobřeň is a municipality and village in Mělník District in the Central Bohemian Region of the Czech Republic. It has about 200 inhabitants. The municipality is known for many well-preserved examples of vernacular architecture.

Administrative parts
Villages and hamlets of Jestřebice, Klučno, Střezivojice and Vlkov are administrative parts of Dobřeň.

Geography
It lies in a hilly and densely forested landscape of the Ralsko Uplands. The Pšovka River flows along the southern municipal border. The entire municipal territory lies in the Kokořínsko – Máchův kraj Protected Landscape Area.

History
The first written mention of Dobřeň is from 1402.

Sights
The municipality is full of well-preserved examples of vernacular village architecture, typical for this region. The village of Dobřeň was declared a village monument reservation, and Jestřebice and Střezivojice were declared village monument zones. Dobřeň is valuable for an important set of folk architecture wooden houses from the 18th and 19th centuries. In Jestřebice are many half-timbered estates with multi-storey houses with galleries. Střezivojice consists of agricultural homesteads and smaller cottages.

References

External links

Villages in Mělník District